Holunchekan Rural District is a rural district (dehestan) in the Central District of Qasr-e Qand County, in Sistan and Baluchestan province, Iran. At the 2006 census, its population was 9,168, in 1,782 families.  The rural district has 40 villages.

References 

Rural Districts of Sistan and Baluchestan Province
Qasr-e Qand County